Four ships of the Royal Navy have been named HMS Dunkirk, after the Channel seaport of Dunkirk, France:

  was a 2-gun ketch captured from the French in 1656 and sold in 1660.
  was a 48-gun fourth rate.  She was launched in 1651 under the name Worcester, but she was renamed Dunkirk on the Restoration in 1660. She was rebuilt in 1704 and 1734, and was broken up in 1749.
  was a 60-gun fourth rate launched in 1754.  She was on harbour service from 1778 and was sold in 1782.
  was a  launched in 1945 and broken up in 1965.

See also
  was a 24-gun sixth rate, previously the French privateer Le Hocquart.
 The  was a French fast battleship of a similar name commissioned in 1937 and scuttled in 1942.

Royal Navy ship names